Karo Mkrtchyan (Armenian: Կարո Մկրտչյան, 28 March 1951 – 2001) was a well-known Armenian painter and public figure. He was aligned with the avant-garde movement. An independent and freethinker, Karo fled the USSR's cultural blockade. For much of his life Karo Mkrtchyan lived and painted outside his native USSR.

Biography 

Karo Mkrtchyan was born in the Banants village, Gardman Province of Artsakh, Armenia. In 1968 he left secondary school. Karo became a member of the Artists' Union of Armenia in 1971 and two years later, in 1973, graduated from the Yerevan State Institute of Art and Drama. In 1981 he was nominated as a member of the Union of Artists of the USSR. He graduated from the Moscow Academy of Painting in 1982. From 1996, Karo was a member of International Association of Artists UNESCO. From 1996 to 1999 he worked in Paris at the International Association of Art.  Karo Mkrtchyan died in Yerevan in 2001.

Expositions 

Since 1967 in Armenia
Since 1974 in Russia 
1980	Uzbekistan, Tashkent
1981	Russia, Moscow
1982	Japan, Tokyo
1982	Estonia, Lithuania, Latvia
1983	Bulgaria, Sofia
1984	Ukraine, Gurzuf
1984	Germany, Norway, Denmark, Hungary, Egypt, Italy, Finland
1985	Russia, Moscow
1985	Ukraine, Kiev
1987	Spain, Madrid
1989	Russia, Novosibirsk
1990	India, Delhi
1994	UAE, Dubai
1996	France, Paris
1997	UAE, Dubai and in other countries Prizes
1969	The First prize for “Autumn” picture, in the child group of RCP. of Transcaucasia
1978	State prize of Armenia in the nomination “The best work of year”
1983	In the International competition in Sofia, the prize "The best artist"
1983	YCL prize of Armenia
1986	The first prize awarded for painting at the international exhibition in Sofia

Thoughts 

It was the very search that made Karo restless since he was a student of the Yerevan State Institute of Art and Drama when his works first expositions took place in the Republic and Transcaucasian exhibitions.

The typical of 1980's generation's trait was a sincere trend in searching new stylistic principles in national painting through the hard furrow to plough. Karo Mkrtchyan was one of the generation brilliant personalities who became a symbol of the national art ascent. His art is diverse from genre and thematic aspects. A number of his works are characterized by a delicate poetic accent and multi-sense content in which the inner tints modulations create an exterior peace, though, full of inner intentions warm-hearted atmosphere.

Karo was an artist of hues. By his singular color gamma he created figure compositions and landscapes full of deep and diverse feelings: expectations, doubt, uneasiness, love...originated by the nowadays world anxieties. Karo Mkrtchyan, through his portraits and landscapes, tells us about common feelings, enhancing the national art boundaries by his unique talent. His landscapes dark green and ceramic gamma truly depicted the site coloring and its singular charm. The artist succeeded in interweaving truth with fiction. Looking at Karo's canvases one could forget the daily routine transferring into thoughtful infinite atmosphere.

The paintings from the "Musicians" and "Portrait" series are nothing but a play of hues, a tissue of mood, reality and dreams, a song coming from the artist's heart. Who are these musicians? They are common people but a bit lyric and delicate. Karo, while laying the dabs on the canvases, seems to remember the greatest poet's thoughts about music-creation of genius designated to elevate and ennoble a man. Music is light and buoyancy-the motive which becomes visible through the harmony of hues.
A complicated play of light and shadow is one typical of his creative work peculiarities due to which he rendered to us mysterious and multi-sense atmosphere.

As for portraits they are also all light and tenderness. With the help of typical of him dark colors, using light and shadow contrast, he succeeded in creating wonderful images. Karo Mkrtchyan created also a number of remarkable canvases-group portraits imbued with harmony between a man and surrounding him world, rendering his affection towards time, color and mankind. Karo's such canvases like "Walk at night" (1977), "Artist" (1979), "Parting" (1978), "Return" (1979) and many others stand apart by rendering complicated emotional state. The artist gives us a chance to experience some other exciting feelings. We are waiting, parting, walking along the streets at night with the heroes...every time feeling the moment stopped by the artist's will, ready to live in this moment forever-penetrating into the space of the image.

Many things in Karo Mkrtchyan's works appear to be in superior extent, either the art main elements like graphics, coloring, composition, or associated with them higher concepts like space, mood, temper.
By common word "graphics" in this case we should understand hundreds of actually prime class graphic works which amaze by the accuracy of delicate lines for depicting the light-air illusion on the paper by the skillful master, Karo Mkrtchyan's graphics are comprehended as human state of mind chronology where the events and the actors, recreated and re-changed, become dramatic situations and personages.
The artist, by scanty means, succeeded in depicting all nuances of the heroes' feelings expressed by mimics and acting. Once being on the paper the image then appears and can be developed on the canvas.
Karo's works breath with a virile tendency, in its healthy meaning, to show his sincerity towards the past art classic samples, the art which core was a man with his inner world.
The actor of the artist's creative work is a Woman, her personification. Her presence, either definite or imaginary, as a twin soul creature, permanently presents in Karo's graphics and paintings.

In 1978 Karo Mkrtchyan for his great canvas "Actress" was awarded YCL prize "For the best creative work". The canvas rendered and generalized the peculiarities of the most of his certainty and sharpness, in here, she is likely embodies the image of art as it is. The heroine's face with chink pupils like in Pierrot's portrait is alive and at the same time, quite abstract, endowed with attractive, magic force. No doubt, the artist aimed at creating complicated, multilayer image and brilliantly achieved his target.

The artist lived a buoyant rise especially in the 1980s. That time he took part in the Republican, All-USSR and dozen foreign countries group exhibitions. His works were exposed in France, Germany, Czechoslovakia, Norway, Finland, Bulgaria, Japan, Denmark and many other countries, they also were established in some issues and catalogues.
The art of the talented painter Karo Mkrtchyan is keeping on its triumphal march with its just, pure and royal colors.

Press articles about Karo Mkrtchyan 

Armenian and foreign press wrote a lot about Karo Mkrtchyan's life and activity.

Prizes 
First prize for "Autumn" picture 1969
State Prize of Armenia in the nomination "The Best Work Of Year" 1978
The international competition in Sofia, "The Best Artist" 1983
YCL of Armenia 1983
First prize awarded for painting at the international exhibition in Sofia 1986.

Paintings are kept in the National Picture Gallery of Armenia, the Museum of Modern Art of Armenia, The Union of Artist of Armenia, in the Fund of the Ministry of Culture of Armenia, the Moscow State Picture galleries, the Art Museum of London, Japan, France, USA and in many private collections.

References

1951 births
2001 deaths
Armenian painters